is Japan's second largest island and comprises the largest and northernmost prefecture, making up its own region. The Tsugaru Strait separates Hokkaidō from Honshu; the two islands are connected by the undersea railway Seikan Tunnel.

The largest city on Hokkaidō is its capital, Sapporo, which is also its only ordinance-designated city. Sakhalin lies about 43 kilometers (26 mi) to the north of Hokkaidō, and to the east and northeast are the Kuril Islands, which are administered by Russia, though the four most southerly are claimed by Japan. Hokkaidō was formerly known as Ezo, Yezo, Yeso, or Yesso.
	
Although there were Japanese settlers who had ruled the southern tip of the island since the 16th century, Hokkaido was considered foreign territory that was inhabited by the indigenous people of the island, known as the Ainu people. While geographers such as Mogami Tokunai and Mamiya Rinzō explored the island in the Edo period, Japan's governance was limited to Oshima Peninsula until the 17th century. The Japanese settlers began their migration to Hokkaido in the 17th century, which often resulted in clashes and revolts between Japanese and Ainu populations. In 1869, following the Meiji Restoration, Ezo was annexed by Japan under on-going colonial practices, and renamed Hokkaido. After this event, Japanese settlers started to colonize the island. While Japanese settlers colonized the island, the Ainu people were dispossessed of their land, forced to assimilate, and aggressively discriminated against by the Japanese settlers.

Names

When establishing the Development Commission, the Meiji government decided to change the name of Ezochi. According to Matsuura, the name was thought up because the Ainu called the region Kai.

In 1947, Hokkaidō became a full-fledged prefecture. The historical suffix 道 (-dō) translates to "prefecture" in English, ambiguously the same as 府 (-fu) for Osaka and Kyoto, and 県 (-ken) for the rest of the "prefectures". Dō, as shorthand, can be used to uniquely identify Hokkaido, for example as in 道道 (dōdō, "Hokkaido road") or 道議会 (Dōgikai, "Hokkaido Assembly"), the same way 都 (-to) is used for Tokyo. "Hokkai-do-ken" (literally "North Sea Province Prefecture") is, therefore, technically speaking, a redundant term, although it is occasionally used to differentiate the government from the island. The prefecture's government calls itself the "Hokkaidō Government" rather than the "Hokkaidō Prefectural Government".

With the rise of indigenous rights movements, there emerges a normative notion that Hokkaido must have an Ainu language name. Whichever Ainu phrase is chosen, its original referent is critically different from the large geographical entity, however. The phrase  has been a preferred choice among Japanese activists. Its primary meaning is the "land of humans", as opposed to the "land of gods". Another phrase  (ヤウンモシㇼ) has gained prominence. It literally means the "onshore land", as opposed to the "offshore land", which, depending on context, can refer to the Kuril Islands, Honshu, or any foreign country. If the speaker is a resident of Hokkaido,  can refer to Hokkaido. Yet another phrase  (アコㇿモシㇼ) means "our (inclusive) land". If uttered among Hokkaido Ainus, it can refer to Hokkaido or Japan as a whole.

History

Early history 
During the Jomon period the local culture and the associated hunter-gatherer lifestyle flourished in Hokkaidō, beginning over 15,000 years ago. In contrast to the island of Honshu, Hokkaidō saw an absence of conflict during this time period. Jomon beliefs in natural spirits are theorized to be the origins of Ainu spirituality. About 2,000 years ago, the island was colonized by Yayoi people, and much of the island's population shifted away from hunting and gathering towards agriculture.

The Nihon Shoki, finished in 720 AD, is often said to be the first mention of Hokkaidō in recorded history. According to the text, Abe no Hirafu led a large navy and army to northern areas from 658 to 660 and came into contact with the Mishihase and Emishi. One of the places Hirafu went to was called , which is often believed to be present-day Hokkaidō. However, many theories exist concerning the details of this event, including the location of Watarishima and the common belief that the Emishi in Watarishima were the ancestors of the present-day Ainu people.

During the Nara and Heian periods (710–1185), people in Hokkaidō conducted trade with Dewa Province, an outpost of the Japanese central government. From the Middle Ages, the people in Hokkaidō began to be called Ezo. The Ezo mainly relied upon hunting and fishing and obtained rice and iron through trade with the Japanese.

Feudal Japan 

During the Muromachi period (1336–1573), the Japanese created a settlement at the south of the Oshima Peninsula, with a series of fortified residences such as that of Shinoridate. As more people moved to the settlement to avoid battles, disputes arose between the Japanese and the Ainu. The disputes eventually developed into war. Takeda Nobuhiro killed the Ainu leader, Koshamain, and defeated the opposition in 1457. Nobuhiro's descendants became the rulers of the Matsumae-han, which was granted exclusive trading rights with the Ainu in the Azuchi-Momoyama and Edo periods (1568–1868). The Matsumae family's economy relied upon trade with the Ainu. They held authority over the south of Ezochi until the end of the Edo period.

The Matsumae clan rule over the Ainu must be understood in the context of the expansion of the Japanese feudal state. Medieval military leaders in northern Honshu (ex. Northern Fujiwara, Akita clan) maintained only tenuous political and cultural ties to the imperial court and its proxies, the Kamakura shogunate and Ashikaga shogunate. Feudal strongmen sometimes located themselves within medieval institutional order, taking shogunate titles, while in other times they assumed titles that seemed to give them a non-Japanese identity. In fact, many of the feudal strongmen were descended from Emishi military leaders who had been assimilated into Japanese society. The Matsumae clan were of Yamato descent like other ethnic Japanese people, whereas the Emishi of northern Honshu were a distinctive group related to the Ainu. The Emishi were conquered and integrated into the Japanese state dating back as far as the 8th century and as result began to lose their distinctive culture and ethnicity as they became minorities. By the time the Matsumae clan ruled over the Ainu, most of the Emishi were ethnically mixed and physically closer to Japanese than they were to Ainu. From this, the "transformation" theory postulates that native Jōmon peoples changed gradually with the infusion of Yayoi immigrants into the Tōhoku, in contrast to the "replacement" theory that posits the Jōmon was replaced by the Yayoi.

There were numerous revolts by the Ainu against the feudal rule. The last large-scale resistance was Shakushain's revolt in 1669–1672. In 1789, a smaller movement known as the Menashi–Kunashir rebellion was crushed. After that rebellion, the terms "Japanese" and "Ainu" referred to clearly distinguished groups, and the Matsumae were unequivocally Japanese.

According to John A. Harrison of the University of Florida, prior to 1868 Japan used proximity as its claim Hokkaido, Saghalien and the Kuril Islands; however, Japan had never really explored, governed, or exploited the areas, and this claim was invalidated by the movement of Russia into the Northeast Pacific area and by Russian settlements on Kamchatka, Saghalien and the Okhotsk Coast.

Leading up to the Meiji Restoration, the Tokugawa shogunate realized there was a need to prepare northern defenses against a possible Russian invasion and took over control of most of Ezochi. Many Japanese settlers regarded the Ainu as "inhumane and the inferior descendants of dogs." The shogunate also imposed various assimilation programs on the Ainu.

Meiji Restoration 
Hokkaidō was known as Ezochi until the Meiji Restoration. Shortly after the Boshin War in 1868, a group of Tokugawa loyalists led by Enomoto Takeaki temporarily occupied the island (the polity is commonly but mistakenly known as the Republic of Ezo), but the rebellion was crushed in May 1869. Through colonial practices, Ezochi was annexed into Japanese territory, and renamed Hokkaido. After 1869, the northern Japanese island was known as Hokkaidō; and regional subdivisions were established, including the provinces of Oshima, Shiribeshi, Iburi, Ishikari, Teshio, Kitami, Hidaka, Tokachi, Kushiro, Nemuro and Chishima.

The primary purpose of the Development Commission was to secure Hokkaidō before the Russians extended their control of the Far East beyond Vladivostok. The Japanese failed to settle in the interior lowlands of the island because of aboriginal resistance. The resistance was eventually destroyed, and the lowlands were under the control of the commission. The most important goal of the Japanese was to increase the farm population and to create a conducive environment for emigration and settlement. However, the Japanese did not have expertise in modern agricultural techniques, and only possessed primitive mining and lumbering methods. Kuroda Kiyotaka was put in charge of the project, and turned to the United States for help.

His first step was to journey to the United States and recruit Horace Capron, President Ulysses S. Grant's commissioner of agriculture. From 1871 to 1873 Capron bent his efforts to expounding Western agriculture and mining, with mixed results. Frustrated with obstacles to his efforts, Capron returned home in 1875. In 1876, William S. Clark arrived to found an agricultural college in Sapporo. Although he only remained a year, Clark left a lasting impression on Hokkaidō, inspiring the Japanese with his teachings on agriculture as well as Christianity. His parting words, "Boys, be ambitious!", can be found on public buildings in Hokkaidō to this day. The population of Hokkaidō boomed from 58,000 to 240,000 during that decade.

In 1882, the Development Commission was abolished. These sub-prefectures still exist today, although they have much less power than they possessed before and during World War II; they now exist primarily to handle paperwork and other bureaucratic functions.

World War II 
In mid-July 1945, various shipping ports, cities, and military facilities in Hokkaidō were attacked by the United States Navy's Task Force 38. On 14–15 July, aircraft operating from the task force's aircraft carriers sank and damaged a large number of ships in ports along Hokkaidō's southern coastline as well as in northern Honshu. In addition, on 15 July a force of three battleships and two light cruisers bombarded the city of Muroran. Before the Japanese surrender was formalized, the Soviet Union made preparations for an invasion of Hokkaidō, but U.S. President Harry Truman made it clear that the surrender of all of the Japanese home islands would be carried out by General Douglas MacArthur per the 1943 Cairo Declaration.

Present 
Hokkaidō became equal with other prefectures in 1947, when the revised Local Autonomy Law became effective.

Geography 

The island of Hokkaidō is located in the north of Japan, near Russia (Sakhalin Oblast). It has coastlines on the Sea of Japan (to the west of the island), the Sea of Okhotsk (to the north), and the Pacific Ocean (to the east). The center of the island is mountainous, with volcanic plateaux. Hokkaidō has multiple plains such as the Ishikari Plain , Tokachi Plain , the Kushiro Plain  (the largest wetland in Japan) and Sarobetsu Plain .

The Tsugaru Strait separates Hokkaidō from Honshu (Aomori Prefecture); La Pérouse Strait separates Hokkaidō from the island of Sakhalin in Russia; Nemuro Strait separates Hokkaidō from Kunashir Island in the Russian Kuril Islands.

The governmental jurisdiction of Hokkaidō incorporates several smaller islands, including Rishiri, Okushiri Island, and Rebun. (By Japanese reckoning, Hokkaidō also incorporates several of the Kuril Islands.) Hokkaidō Prefecture is the largest and northernmost Japanese prefecture. The island ranks 21st in the world by area.

Population

Hokkaidō has the third-largest population of Japan's five main islands, with 5,383,579 people . It has the lowest population-density in Japan with just 64.5/km2 (160/sq mi) (2016). By population, it ranks 21st globally. Major cities include Sapporo and Asahikawa in the central region and the port of Hakodate facing Honshu in the south. Sapporo is the largest city of Hokkaidō and 5th-largest in Japan.

Flora and fauna 

There are three populations of the Ussuri brown bear found on the island. There are more brown bears in Hokkaidō than anywhere else in Asia besides Russia. The Hokkaidō brown bear is separated into three distinct lineages. There are only eight lineages in the world. Those on Honshu died out long ago.

The native conifer species in northern Hokkaidō is the Sakhalin fir (Abies sachalinensis). The flowering plant Hydrangea hirta is also found on the island.

{| class="wikitable sortable"
|+ Notable flora and fauna
|-
! Name !! Type 
! Notes
|-
| Ussuri brown bear
| Fauna 
| One of the largest populations by average size of brown bears (Ursus arctos lasiotus)
|-
| Steller's sea eagle
| Fauna
| On average, the heaviest eagle species in the world (Haliaeetus pelagicus)
|-
| Hokkaido wolf || Fauna 
| Extinct subspecies of the gray wolf (Canis lupus hattai).
|-
| Yezo sika deer || Fauna 
| Large subspecies of the sika deer (Cervus nippon yesoensis)
|-
| Ezoris
| Fauna
| Also called the Ezo squirrel (Sciurus vulgaris orientis)
|-
| Ezo red fox
| Fauna
| Native to northern Japanese archipelago (Vulpes vulpes schrencki)
|-
| Ezo tanuki
| Fauna
| Subspecies of raccoon dog native to Hokkaido (Nyctereutes viverrinus albus)
|-
| Hokkaido dog
| Fauna
| A Spitz-type domesticated hunting dog perhaps descend from introduced Akitas
|-
| Dosanko
| Fauna
| Also called the "Hokkaido horse" 
|-
|Sable
|Fauna
|(Martes zibellina) A species of marten which inhabits Hokkaido and Northern Asia.
|-
| Viviparous lizard
| Fauna
| (Zootoca vivipara)
|-
| Ezo salamander
| Fauna
| (Hynobius retardatus)
|-
| Dolly Varden trout
| Fauna
| (Salvelinus malma)
|-
|Sasakia charonda
|Fauna
|National butterfly of Japan (ō-murasaki, "great purple")
|-
|Grey Heron
|Fauna
|(Ardea cinerea) Long legged wading bird.
|-
|Chum salmon
|Fauna
|(white salmon (白鮭 シロサケ) is native to middle and northern Honshu, Hokkaido and the North Pacific.
|-
|Sockeye salmon
|Fauna
|(Oncorhynchus nerka, ベニザケ - Benizake) live in Hokkaido and the North Pacific.
|-
| Ezo spruce
| Flora
| Picea jezoensis
|-
| Sakhalin spruce
| Flora
| Picea glehnii
|-
| Japanese rose
| Flora
| Rosa rugosa
|}

Geologic activity 

Like many areas of Japan, Hokkaidō is seismically active. Aside from numerous earthquakes, the following volcanoes are considered still active (at least one eruption since 1850):

 Hokkaido Koma-ga-take
 Mount Usu and Shōwa-shinzan
 Mount Tarumae
 Mount Tokachi
 Mount Meakan

In 1993, an earthquake of magnitude 7.7 generated a tsunami which devastated Okushiri, killing 202 inhabitants. An earthquake of magnitude 8.3 struck near the island on September 26, 2003. On September 6, 2018, an earthquake of magnitude 6.6 struck with its epicenter near the city of Tomakomai, causing a blackout across the whole island.

On May 16, 2021, an earthquake measuring 6.1 on the Richter scale struck off Japan's Hokkaidō prefecture.

Parks 

 Twelve prefectural natural parks (道立自然公園). The prefectural natural parks cover 146,802 ha, the largest area of any prefecture.
Akkeshi Prefectural Natural Park
Esan Prefectural Natural Park
Furano-Ashibetsu Prefectural Natural Park
Hiyama Prefectural Natural Park
Kariba-Motta Prefectural Natural Park
Matsumae-Yagoshi Prefectural Natural Park
North Okhotsk Prefectural Natural Park
Nopporo Shinrin Kōen Prefectural Natural Park
Notsuke-Fūren Prefectural Natural Park
Sharidake Prefectural Natural Park
Shumarinai Prefectural Natural Park
Teshiodake Prefectural Natural Park

Subprefectures 

, Hokkaidō has nine General Subprefectural Bureaus (総合振興局) and five Subprefectural Bureaus (振興局). Hokkaidō is one of eight prefectures in Japan that have subprefectures (支庁 shichō). However, it is the only one of the eight to have such offices covering the whole of its territory outside the main cities (rather than having them just for outlying islands or remote areas). This is mostly because of its great size; many parts of the prefecture are simply too far away to be effectively administered by Sapporo. Subprefectural offices in Hokkaidō carry out many of the duties that prefectural offices fulfill elsewhere in Japan.

Municipalities 
Hokkaidō is divided into 179 municipalities.

Cities 
There are 35 cities in Hokkaidō:

Towns and villages 
These are the towns and villages in Hokkaido Prefecture:

Climate

As Japan's coldest region, Hokkaidō has relatively cool summers and icy/snowy winters. Most of the island falls in the humid continental climate zone with Köppen climate classification Dfb (hemiboreal) in most areas but Dfa (hot summer humid continental) in some inland lowlands.

The northern portion of Hokkaidō falls into the taiga biome with significant snowfall. The island tends to have isolated snowstorms that develop long-lasting snowbanks. The generally high quality of powder snow and numerous mountains in Hokkaidō make it a popular region for snow sports. The snowfall usually commences in earnest in November and ski resorts (such as those at Niseko, Furano, Teine and Rusutsu) usually operate between December and April. Hokkaidō celebrates its winter weather at the Sapporo Snow Festival.

During the winter, passage through the Sea of Okhotsk is often complicated by large floes of drift ice. Combined with high winds that occur during winter, this frequently brings air travel and maritime activity to a halt beyond the northern coast of Hokkaidō. Ports on the open Pacific Ocean and Sea of Japan are generally ice-free year round, though most rivers freeze during the winter.

Unlike the other major islands of Japan, Hokkaidō is normally not affected by the June–July rainy season and the relative lack of humidity and typically warm, rather than hot, summer weather makes its climate an attraction for tourists from other parts of Japan.

Temperature comparison

Major cities and towns 

Hokkaidō's largest city is the capital, Sapporo, which is a designated city. The island has two core cities: Hakodate in the south and Asahikawa in the central region. Other important population centers include Rumoi, Iwamizawa, Kushiro, Obihiro, Kitami, Abashiri, Wakkanai, and Nemuro.

Gallery

Economy

Although there is some light industry (most notably paper milling and beer brewing) most of the population is employed by the service sector. In 2001, the service sector and other tertiary industries generated more than three-quarters of the gross domestic product.

Agriculture and other primary industries play a large role in Hokkaidō's economy. Hokkaidō has nearly one fourth of Japan's total arable land. It ranks first in the nation in the production of a host of agricultural products, including wheat, soybeans, potatoes, sugar beets, onions, pumpkins, corn, raw milk, and beef. Hokkaidō also accounts for 22% of Japan's forests with a sizable timber industry. The prefecture is first in the nation in production of marine products and aquaculture. The average farm size in Hokkaidō is 26 hectares per farmer in 2013, which is almost 11 times bigger than the national average of 2.4 hectares.

Tourism is an important industry, especially during the cool summertime when visitors are attracted to Hokkaidō's open spaces from hotter and more humid parts of Japan and other Asian countries. During the winter, skiing and other winter sports bring other tourists, and increasingly international ones, to the island.

Coal mining played an important role in the industrial development of Hokkaidō, with the Ishikari coalfield. Cities such as Muroran were primarily developed to supply the rest of the archipelago with coal.

Transportation

Hokkaidō's only land link to the rest of Japan is the Seikan Tunnel. Most travellers travel to the island by air: the main airport is New Chitose Airport at Chitose, just south of Sapporo. Tokyo–Chitose is in the top 10 of the world's busiest air routes, handling more than 40 widebody round trips on several airlines each day. One of the airlines, Air Do was named after Hokkaidō.

Hokkaidō can be reached by ferry from Sendai, Niigata and some other cities, with the ferries from Tokyo dealing only in cargo. The Hokkaido Shinkansen takes passengers from Tokyo to near Hakodate in slightly over four hours. There is a fairly well-developed railway network, but many cities can only be accessed by road. The coal railways were constructed around Sapporo and Horonai during the late 19th century, as advised by American engineer Joseph Crawford.

Hokkaidō is home to one of Japan's Melody Roads, which is made from grooves cut into the ground, which when driven over causes a tactile vibration and audible rumbling transmitted through the wheels into the car body.

Education 

The Hokkaido Prefectural Board of Education oversees public schools (except colleges and universities) in Hokkaidō. Public elementary and junior high schools (except Hokkaido Noboribetsu Akebi Secondary School and schools attached to Hokkaidō University of Education) are operated by municipalities, and public high schools are operated by either the prefectural board or municipalities.

Senior high schools

, there are 291 high schools in Hokkaido: 4 national schools, 55 private schools, 233 public schools, and 2 integrated junior-senior schools.

Colleges and universities

Hokkaidō has 34 universities (7 national, 6 local public, and 21 private universities), 15 junior colleges, and 6 colleges of technology (3 national, 1 local public, and 2 private colleges).

Culture 

 Sapporo ramen, Jingisukan
 Hokkaidō Heritage
 Hokkaido Museum
 Hokkaido Museum of Northern Peoples
 Hokkaido Museum of Modern Art
 Historical Village of Hokkaido
 Hokkaido Archaeological Operations Center
 Pacific Music Festival

Sports 

The 1972 Winter Olympics were held in Sapporo.

The sports teams listed below are based in Hokkaidō.
Hokkaido American Football Association
Consadole Sapporo (Association football)
Hokkaido Nippon-Ham Fighters
Levanga Hokkaido (basketball)
Japan Basketball League
Nippon Paper Cranes (Ice hockey)
Oji Eagles (Ice hockey)
Loco Solare (Curling)

Winter festivals
 Sapporo Snow Festival
 Asahikawa Ice Festival
 Sōunkyō Ice Festival
 Big Air – snowboarding freestyle competition
 Shōwa-Shinzan International Yukigassen - competitive snowballing

International relations
Hokkaidō has relationships with several provinces, states, and other entities worldwide.
  Alberta, Canada, since 1980
  Heilongjiang, China, since 1980
  Massachusetts, United States, since 1988
  Sakhalin Oblast, Russia, since 1998
  Busan, South Korea, since 2005
  Gyeongsangnam-do, South Korea, since 2006
  Seoul, South Korea, since 2010
  Chiang Mai, Thailand, since 2013
  Thimphu, Bhutan
  Hawaii, United States of America

, 74 individual municipalities in Hokkaidō have sister city agreements with 114 cities in 21 countries worldwide.

Politics

Governor 
The current governor of Hokkaido is Naomichi Suzuki. He won the governorship in the gubernatorial election in 2019 as an independent. In 1999, Hori was supported by all major non-Communist parties and Itō ran without party support. Before 1983, the governorship had been held by Liberal Democrats Naohiro Dōgakinai and Kingo Machimura for 24 years. In the 1971 election when Machimura retired, the Socialist candidate Shōhei Tsukada lost to Dōgakinai by only 13,000 votes; Tsukada was also supported by the Communist Party – the leftist cooperation in opposition to the US-Japanese security treaty had brought joint Socialist-Communist candidates to victory in many other prefectural and local elections in the 1960s and 1970s. In 1959, Machimura had defeated Yokomichi's father Setsuo in the race to succeed Hokkaidō's first elected governor, Socialist Toshibumi Tanaka who retired after three terms. Tanaka had only won the governorship in 1947 in a run-off election against Democrat Eiji Arima because no candidate had received the necessary vote share to win in the first round as required by law at the time.

Assembly 
The Hokkaido Legislative Assembly has 100 members from 47 electoral districts. , the LDP caucus holds a majority with 51 seats, the DPJ-led group has 26 members. Other groups are the Hokkaidō Yūshikai of New Party Daichi and independents with twelve seats, Kōmeitō with eight, and the Japanese Communist Party with four members. General elections for the Hokkaido assembly are currently held together with gubernatorial elections in the unified local elections (last round: April 2015).

National representation 
For the lower house of the National Diet, Hokkaidō is divided into twelve single-member electoral districts. In the 2017 election, candidates from the governing coalition of Liberal Democrats and Kōmeitō won seven districts and the main opposition Constitutional Democrats five. For the proportional election segment, Hokkaidō and Tokyo are the only two prefectures that form a regional "block" district of their own. The Hokkaido proportional representation block elects eight Representatives. In 2017, the Liberal Democratic Party received 28.8% of the proportional vote and won three seats, the Constitutional Democratic Party won three (26.4% of the vote), one seat each went to Kibō no Tō (12.3%) and Kōmeitō (11.0%). The Japanese Communist Party, who won a seat in 2014, lost their seat in 2017 while receiving 8.5% of the votes.

In the upper house of the National Diet, a major reapportionment in the 1990s halved the number of Councillors from Hokkaidō per election from four to two. After the elections of 2010 and 2013, the Hokkaido electoral district – like most two-member districts for the upper house – is represented by two Liberal Democrats and two Democrats. In the 2016 upper house election, the district magnitude will be raised to three, Hokkaidō will then temporarily be represented by five members and six after the 2019 election.

See also
 Former Hokkaidō Government Office
 Hokkaido dialects
 People from Hokkaido
 Sankebetsu brown bear incident
 Sinnoh, a fictional region in the Pokémon franchise which is based on Hokkaido.
 List of cities in Hokkaido by population

Notes

Citations

Explanatory notes 
 Source: English edition of Sightseeing in Hokkaido, Winter Festival and Events

General references 
 
 Bisignani, J. D. (1993). Japan Handbook. Chico, California: Moon Publications. ; ; OCLC 8954556
 McDougall, Walter A. (1993). Let the Sea Make a Noise: A History of the North Pacific from Magellan to MacArthur. New York: Basic Books. ; OCLC 28017793
 Nussbaum, Louis-Frédéric and Käthe Roth. (2005). Japan encyclopedia. Cambridge: Harvard University Press. ; OCLC 58053128

External links 

 Hokkaido Official Website 
 Hokkaido Official Website 
 Amazing Details on Hokkaido (In English)
 Hokkaido Ski Resort 

 
 
Ainu geography
Japanese archipelago
Prefectures of Japan